Stop bar or stopbar may refer to:

 Stopbar tailpiece on the stoptail bridge of an electric guitar or archtop guitar
 Stop line, a transverse road surface marking